Halkaa is a 2018 Indian Hindi-language family film directed by PadmaShri Nila Madhab Panda starring Ranvir Shorey & Paoli Dam. The movie was released on 7 September 2018. A trailer was released on 7 August 2018

Plot
The film follows a young boy, Pichku's journey from the slums of Mumbai to Delhi to fulfill his dream of owning a toilet, against his fathers wishes.

Cast
 Paoli Dam as Shobha
 Ranvir Shorey as Ramesh

Soundtrack

External links

References 

2010s Hindi-language films
2018 films
Indian family films